Blanca is a Spanish municipality in the Region of Murcia, located  in the "Vega Alta del Segura". It belongs to one of the six municipalities of the Ricote Valley (Valle de Ricote), together with Abarán, Ojós,  Ricote, Ulea, Archena and Villanueva de Segura. Blanca has an area of 87.7 km ², its  average height is 233 m and the village has 6489 inhabitants, according to the INE in 2011.

Road Communications

The main  road communication, near Blanca, is the motorway A-30 (Albacete, Murcia). The A-33,  between La Font de la Figuera and Blanca, is currently built. This motorway will improve the connection to Valencia.

From Murcia, Blanca is accessed through the motorway A-30, Exit 111 Blanca-ffcc rail station. From Madrid, through the outlet 110 of the motorway A-30, or the main road  N-301. From Valencia, one can drive to Blanca through the intersection of the  future motorway A-33 to the motorway A-30, or via the main road N-344.

History
The population existed before the Muslim era, during the independent maritime state of Cartagena.
In fact, to protect and fortify the port and the inlands, some of the best masons in Europe were sent to build and create communities by the fortifications and bridges under construction. Blanca is in fact one of the rare area where wounded soldiers, orphans and widows could take refuge, regardless of their religion  or nation. This humanitarian sanctuary was then confirmed by the Vatican.

We have to go to the year 713, with the arrival of the Arab conquest, to find permanent human presence in the town of Blanca. The first testimony brings us the remainder of its castle, dating from the twelfth century.  In the thirteenth century, it was known by the name of "Negra", apparently because of the color of the black mountain near to the castle and population center. This castle was built between 1155 and 1171 by the first King of Murcia, Muhammad ibn Mardanis, known as the "Wolf King". The historical connection to form part of the Moorish Ricote Valley was found in 1228, during the insurrection led by Ibn Hud as from Ricote against the Almohads.  However, after his death, ten years later, anarchy and lawlessness propagated in the Kingdom of Murcia, causing the Alcaraz Pact signed with Castile in 1243, which required the submission to the Crown as a protectorate. Respecting and guaranteeing the possessions, and Muslim traditions  in change of vassalage to the Castilian king. Once Alfonso X on the Castilian throne and after breaking some clauses of the Treaty, the Mudéjar population revolts, between 1264 and 1266. After suffocating the revolution, Alfonso X gave  the Ricote Valley population  the Jurisdiction of the city of Murcia, being so included in the territory of the city. With the death of the eldest son and Castilian heir, Fernando de la Cerda, the struggle began for the succession to the throne of Castile. The struggle was between Fernando's sons, the infants de la Cerda, and his uncle, son of Alfonso X, the Infante Don Sancho.  Future Sancho IV, promised, in a document dated 25 March 1281, to reward the Order of Santiago by donating the Ricote Valley, including Negra (Blanca), if they help him in his struggle for the crown. When being proclaimed king in Seville 19 November 1285, Sancho IV fulfills his commitment and gave to the Order of Santiago the Ricote Valley, their neighbourhoods, villages and places, for the support provided (1).

Peace did not last many years in the Ricote Valley  because James II of Aragón invaded the Kingdom of Murcia, in 1296, to reward himself  for the help given to the other party, i.e.| the Infants de la Cerda, in the struggle for succession of the throne against his uncle. During this occupation, Negra and its castle were given to the counselor Bernardo de Sarria, although the santiaguista commander of Ricote claimed  to replace them to John Osores on 19 September 1303. The last time the name of Negra is stated in a document is in the year 1315. The change of the name Negra to Blanca probably  took place between the years 1353 and 1362 by the influence of Dona Blanca de Borbón, Queen of Castile, who was abandoned by King Pedro I and defended by Fadrique, Master of the Order of Santiago,  and by Sancho Sanchez de Moscoso, the santiaguista commander of Ricote (2). Years later, precisely in 1382, Blanca appeared  for the first time under the name of Blanca.  The Advancer (Counselor) of the Kingdom of Murcia, Martin Alonso de Valdivieso, required the freedom of a Moor from Blanca, who was captured upon request of a Jew of Elche.  (3). Unfair events  could not stop the war instability in the middle decades of the fifteenth century. It caused the abandonment of  Blanca's  people marching with the troops of the King of Granada after a foray into the Kingdom of Murcia. Thereafter, after demanding tax benefits, Blanca's people returned.  After the bloody sack of Cieza in 1477, leaving the villages depopulated,  the inhabitants of Blanca again left their village. They returned  again in 1492 after the conquest of the Kingdom of Granada. The domain of the Order of Santiago on Blanca and the rest of the Ricote Valley would be extended until the nineteenth century. In order to improve the performance of their lands, in the early years of this domain, the Order convinced to convert  to Christianity  the Mohammedans of Blanca before the new law in 1501. In this way,  they were now called new Christians. The Mohammedans converted after the new law in 1501 were called Moors. Some years thereafter, in 1507,  the Catholic Monarchs gave instructions to build churches on the old mosques (4). The Muslim population hoped, with this conversion to Christianity, to get rid of the fiscal pressures to which they were subject all the time. However, their frustration was great seeing that this was not the case, and this provoked a violent uprising of the Moorish population throughout the Valley in 1517. This rebellion was suppressed and repressed a year later.

Throughout the sixteenth century, Blanca experienced a significant increase in the population of the village. Philip II, always lacking money due to his wars, arranged a new strategy for obtaining money: that one of creating municipalities. Consequently, Blanca got on 10 August 1591  from Philip II the privilege of the municipality at the cost of 2400 ducats. The expulsion of the new Christians of the Ricote Valley - now suddenly called Moriscoes - decreed in 1613 by Philip III left in ruin the  lands of Blanca.  Blanca left only with a population of 300 people (5), due to the forced exodus of its inhabitants. However,  10–15 years after 45% of its inhabitants returned to their lands (6). Miguel de Cervantes Saavedra wrote at length about the Moorish Ricote Valley through the figure of Morisco Ricote (7). Many authors thought the Morisco Ricote came from Esquivias or Albacete, but Govert Westerveld, one of the two chroniclers of the town proved that the Morisco Ricote came from the Ricote Valley (8)  as confirmed in 2010 by Professor Francisco Márquez Villanueva (9). Back in the Golden Century of Murcia, eighteenth century, Blanca began to recover its loss of the population, moving from 700 inhabitants in 1713 to 1378 in 1786, according to the Census Floridablanca.  The present church dedicated to St. John the Evangelist was rebuilt at the end of the seventeenth and the beginning of the eighteenth century by the stonecutter brothers Lucas and Antonio de la Lastra. The building was finished in the year 1717.
 
 
After the War of Independence (1808-1814), Blanca's  privilege was ratified by King Ferdinand VII in 1819. Nine years later, the Kingdom of Murcia is hit by an epidemic of yellow fever, and Blanca was elected by the Chapter of the Cathedral of Murcia as a refuge from the disease, and through the intercession of St. Roch the fever did not reach Blanca, according to tradition. St. Roch was named as  the pattern of Blanca seeing the results of  praying of the inhabitants from Blanca to him. Freed from the control  by the Order of Santiago, in 1851, and after the revolutionary events and the restoration of the monarchy of Cánovas del Castillo in Alfonso XII, Blanca faces the entrance of the new century, better prepared than some of the surrounding municipalities. In 1856, the inhabitants arranged the building of a new bridge over the River Segura. In 1869,  a rural road was finished to connect the city with the railway station. In 1894 public lighting was installed. Also in 1894, Blanca suffered several collapses from the hillsides being destroyed several buildings, including a home-hospital and shelter for the poor. The result was a complete change of the landscapes which motivated the construction of new houses and streets. During the twentieth century, the turbulent political and social periods were lived in the town with regularity as the rest of the region. Proclaimed the Second Republic in the 1931 elections, the conservative parties, grouped in the Spanish Confederation of Autonomous Rights (CEDA), won the elections. The neighboring Cieza had to declare a state of war, and there were several deaths in Alguazas. The 1936 elections, which were won by a coalition of leftist parties called "The Popular Front", returned to cause violent altercations throughout the Region. This heralded the civil conflict that ended with the rise by a part of the army on 17 July of the same year. As in the rest of the country during these years there were isolated social crisis. However, when it was the case then the most noticeable awareness was reflected in the attacks on convents and churches, such as the convent of  "La Milagrosa" and the Parish of Blanca's church "San Juan Evangelista". As a result of this violence, Blanca missed a significant number of religious art, especially in religious imagery (saved from the same attacks one of the most prestigious and appreciated image of the "Christ tied to the column" of a Salzillo style and authorship of Sanchez Tapia).

Despite remaining at the side of the Republic, the region of Murcia remained far from the front lines because there was little military action, except sporadic bombing ports of Cartagena and Águilas. In March 1939,  the national side's troops occupied the city along with the rest of the region. From a demographic standpoint, the twentieth century has been a time of stagnation for Blanca. A century earlier it had 6,000 inhabitants, which same figure remains in the twenty-first century. Today, immigration is essential to maintain and increase this number. This is not surprising because the economy of the municipality at the beginning of the century was based on agriculture, esparto (10) and the sale of timber, what gradually disappeared with the advent of synthetic fibers. These circumstances and the closure of cannery industries and the abandonment of logging forced the emigration of many local residents to other places.
Only agriculture, currently devoted to fruit and grapes, received a significant boost with the waters of the Tajo-Segura. However, Blanca's inhabitants do not surrender to adversity and fight together to face future times in a remarkable effort to develop their city.

Sights

 Church St. John the Evangelist of the eighteenth century
 Moorish Castle of the twelfth century
 Peña Negra (volcanic black rock on which the city sits)
 Blanca Museum and Art Center (MUCAB) International architectural landmark
 Pedro Cano's Foundation
 Centro Negra, space for research and contemporary creation (AADK)
 Interpretation Centre of Water and Light
 Hermitage of Saint Roch (Baroque)
 Holy Family Chapel
 Hermitage of San Pedro
 Church "Virgen del Pilar"
 Ferris Wheel "Núñez Miguelico"
 Craftsman House Workshop "Center Negra". In a prime location on the outskirts of the Moorish castle; there are courses in painting, art...
 Country house "La Favorita"
 Walkways along the river.

Economy
 Industrial Estate "San Roque"
 Industrial Estate "Ángel Prieto Oliva"

Festivities and important Events

Easter Festivities: 
As in other places in the region, when Lent comes all the religious groups (cofradías)  and brotherhoods to bring passion finalize preparations for the acts and parades full of fervor and passion. At present,  there are eight religious groups in Blanca, of which the oldest ones are: 
The Royal and Most Illustrious Brotherhood of Our Father Jesus of Nazareth, 
The Brotherhood of St. John the Evangelist, 
The Royal Congregation of the Sacred Hearts of Jesus and Mary 
The Brotherhood of Servitas  of  Our Lady of the Virgin of Sorrows.

Other religious groups of a later date are: 
The Brotherhood of Veronica, 
The Brotherhood of San Pedro, 
The Brotherhood of St Mary Magdalene

and the younger Brotherhood:
The Brotherhood of the Agony in the Garden

The Brotherhood of the Agony in the Garden carried the image of the Virgin of Sorrows to the Good Friday procession in 1986, and this was three years later after the foundations of this brotherhood. It is worth mentioning,  the traditional Bid of Images that shows the emotion of the Blanca's inhabitants to pay for carrying on their shoulders the chosen image.

Summer Festivities: 
In August Blanca celebrates its summer festivities  and again in honor of their patron Saint Roche. Here the decor changes,  now they deal with the sweet bread (la mona) and the bulls. The running of the bulls has in Blanca the famous declaration of Regional Tourist Interest, and it is  undoubtedly the most celebrated day for all residents in Blanca. The running of the bulls  is a very old tradition that has been held for over three hundred fifty years,  and it  is a unique event in the Region of Murcia. During the morning the atmosphere that prevails throughout the entire running route of the bulls,  is a limitless joy, in which dance and parade of bands  encourage all who join the festivities,  and where everyone is welcome.  It is always held before 15 August. The life and traditions of the city are well described by another chronicler of the village, Ángel Ríos Martínez (11-25).

Spring Festivities: 
Blanca in Spring - after the Semana Santa -  begins with a week of festivities dedicated to the patron of Saint Roche. The most characteristics of these festivities are the Coronation of the Queen and the Pilgrimage. The pilgrimage is to return the patron of the municipality from the church located in the center of the city to his own hermitage dedicated to this patron.   People will bring the patron after one day to the place where he was received  with jubilation and skyrockets.

Twin towns
 Anguillara Sabazia, Italy
Twinning is an act that takes place "between two people, two cultures, with the aim of bringing, joining customs, relationships, feelings ...." This could well be a definition of twinning, "gemellaggio" in Italian. In these lines Irene Molina explained years ago, in 1999, which were her  impressions in the face of event occurred between  Blanca and the Italian brother Anguillara Sabazia.

In the late 20th century, Blanca had the idea of twinning a distant Italian town Italian located about thirty miles from Rome, called Anguillara Sabazia. This village was a similar to Blanca as to its structure, its climate, its importance of water and a landscape represented by a lake in Anguillara (Bracciano) and the river (Segura) in the municipality of Blanca. In the last month of August, 1998  twinning began between Anguillara and Blanca, with the arrival of a representation of  "anguilarillos" to Blanca. A representation of fifty-five inhabitants of Blanca traveled on 4 May 1998 to Italy for visiting Anguillara and for consolidating the twinning.

References 
 
(1) Ríos Martínez, Ángel (1999). Blanca, una página de su historia: Época mora.

(2) Westerveld, Govert (2005). Doña Blanca y Don Fadrique (1333 -1361) y el cambio de Negra (Murcia) a Blanca.
Editor: ; 511 pages.

(3) Westerveld, Govert (1997). Historia de Blanca, lugar más islamizado de la región murciana, años 711-1700. . 900 páginas. Prólogo del Profesor Juan Torres Fontes, universidad de Murcia.

(4) Ríos Martínez, Ángel (1997). Blanca, una página de su historia: La Parroquia. 

(5) Fraile Marcos de Guadalajar (1614) "Prodición y destierro de los moriscos de Castilla, hasta el Valle de Ricote."

(6) Westerveld, Govert (2002). Blanca, "El Ricote" de Don Quijote : expulsión y regreso de los moriscos del último enclave islámico más grande de España, años 1613-1654. . 1004 páginas. Prólogo Prof. Dr. Francisco Márquez Villanueva - Universidad de Harvard - USA.

(7) Cervantes de Saavedra, Miguel (1615). Don Quijote de la Mancha, libro II, capítulos 54, 55, 63, 64 y 65.

(8) Westerveld, Govert (2007). Miguel de Cervantes Saavedra, Ana Félix y el morisco Ricote del Valle de Ricote en "Don Quijote II" del año 1615. (capítulos 54, 55, 63, 64 y 65) . 384 páginas. Dedicado al Profesor Francisco Márquez Villanueva.

(9) Márquez Villanueva, Francisco (2010). Moros moriscos y turcos de Cervantes. Bellaterra, .

(10) Ríos Martínez, Ángel (1999). Blanca, una página de sus historia: El Esparto. 141 páginas.

(11) Ríos Martínez, Ángel (2006). Las tradiciones de Blanca. 36 páginas.

(12) Ríos Martínez, Angel (2006). Los rosarios de la Aurora.

(13) Ríos Martínez, Ángel (2000). Blanca, una página de su historia: Crónica 2000. 193 páginas.

(14) Ríos Martínez, Ángel (2001). Blanca, una página de su historia: Crónica 2001. 291 páginas.

(15) Ríos Martínez, Ángel (2001). José Fuentes Cano (El Padre Pepe). 24 páginas.

(16) Ríos Martínez, Ángel (2002). Blanca, una página de su historia: Crónica 2002. 331 páginas.

(17) Ríos Martínez, Ángel (2003). Blanca, una página de su historia: Crónica 2003. 136 páginas.

(18) Ríos Martínez, Ángel (2004). Blanca, una página de su historia: Crónica 2004. 268 páginas.

(19) Ríos Martínez, Ángel (2005). Blanca, una página de su historia: Crónica 2005. 256 páginas.

(20) Ríos Martínez, Ángel (2006). Blanca, una página de su historia: Crónica 2006. 224 páginas.

(21) Ríos Martínez, Ángel (2006). ¡Alegría!, es Navidad.

(22) Ríos Martínez, Ángel (2007). Blanca, una página de su historia: Crónica 2007. 292 páginas.

(23) Ríos Martínez, Ángel (2007). Los Rosarios de la Aurora. 32 páginas.

(24) Ríos Martínez, Ángel (2007). Baño de la Cruz. 15 páginas.

(25) Ríos Martínez, Ángel (2008). Blanca, una página de su historia: Crónica 2008. 171 páginas.

Municipalities in the Region of Murcia